Finstall is a village and civil parish in the Bromsgrove District of Worcestershire, England, with a population of 663.

Finstall Park, the home ground of Bromsgrove RFC, can be found in the village along with Bromsgrove Cricket, Tennis and Hockey Clubs, as well as their corresponding sporting facilities and club houses. It has one pub, The Cross Inn.

External links
 Finstall Parish Council
 Finstall Village Hall
 St Godwalds Church

References 

Villages in Worcestershire